Below is a list of members of the 5th National Assembly of Namibia (2010–2015). They were selected by their parties based on the results of the 2009 parliamentary election. This National Assembly, like each of the previous National Assemblies, was led by the South West Africa People's Organization.

South West Africa People's Organization
 Theo-Ben Gurirab Speaker of the National Assembly
 Loide Kasingo Deputy Speaker of the National Assembly 
 Nahas Angula Prime Minister
 Hage Geingob
 Pendukeni Iivula-Ithana
 Nangolo Mbumba
 Jerry Ekandjo
 Utoni Nujoma
 Alpheus ǃNaruseb
 Abraham Iyambo
 Petrina Haingura
 Richard Kamwi
 Kazenambo Kazenambo
 Joel Kaapanda
 Erkki Nghimtina
 John Mutorwa
 Nahas Angula
 Tjekero Tweya
 Petrus Iilonga
 Immanuel Ngatjizeko
 Pohamba Shifeta
 Elia Kaiyamo
 Albert Kawana
 Bernhardt Esau
 Doreen Sioka
 Saara Kuugongelwa-Amadhila
 Paulus Kapia
 Charles Namoloh
 Peya Mushelenga
 Alpheus Muheua
 Priscilla Beukes
 Priscilla Beukes
 Erastus Uutoni
 Billy Mwaningange
 Marco Hausiku
 Lucia Witbooi
 Angelika Muharukua
 Auguste Xoagus
 Chief Samuel Ankama
 Uahekua Herunga
 Rosalia Nghidinwa
 Willem Isaack
 Nickey Iyambo
 Sylvia Makgone
 David Namwandi
 Piet van der Walt
 Lempy Lucas
 Isak Katali
 Elifas Dingara
 Festus Ueitele
 Juliet Kavetuna
 Moses Amweelo
 Evelyne Nawases-Taeyele
 Alexia Manambo-Ncube
 Ben Amathila
 Netumbo Nandi-Ndaitwah

Rally for Democracy and Progress
 Hidipo Hamutenya
 Steve Bezuidenhout
 Jesaya Nyamu
 Agnes Limbo
 Anton von Wietersheim
 Kandy Nehova
 Peter Naholo
 Heiko Lucks

Democratic Turnhalle Alliance
 Katuutire Kaura 
 Phillemon Moongo

National Unity Democratic Organisation
 Kuaima Riruako
 Arnold Tjihuiko

United Democratic Front
 Justus ǁGaroëb
 Simson Tjongarero

Congress of Democrats
 Ben Ulenga

Republican Party
 Henk Mudge
 Clara Gowases; Mudge resigned in 2011 and was replaced by Gowases

References

5th
2000s in Namibia
2010 in Namibia